Funkdafied is the debut album by American rapper Da Brat. It was released on June 28, 1994, and sold over one million copies, making her the first solo female rapper to go Platinum. Funkdafied debuted and peaked at number 11 on the Billboard 200, and topped the Rap Charts and Top R&B/Hip-Hop Albums chart. The album was preceded by the first single, "Funkdafied", released on May 13, 1994. The single went Platinum in August and then the album went Platinum in January 1995.

Track listing
 "Da Sh*t Ya Can't Fuc Wit" – 2:23
 "Fa All Y'all" (featuring Kandi) – 3:19
 "Fire It Up" – 3:30
 "Funkdafied" (featuring Jermaine Dupri) – 3:05
 "May Da Funk Be With Ya" (featuring LaTocha Scott) – 4:13
 "Ain't No Thang" (featuring Y-Tee) – 3:54
 "Come & Get Some" (featuring Mac Daddy of Kris Kross) – 3:12
 "Mind Blowin'" – 4:31
 "Give It 2 You" – 3:13

Charts

Weekly charts

Year-end charts

Certifications

References

See also
List of number-one R&B albums of 1994 (U.S.)

Da Brat albums
1994 debut albums
Albums produced by Jermaine Dupri
So So Def Recordings albums
G-funk albums